The Time Capsule is a 2022 American film directed by Erwann Marshall in his feature directorial debut from a screenplay co-written with Chad Fifer. It stars Todd Grinnell, Brianna Hildebrand, KaDee Strickland, Baron Vaughn, and Ravi Patel. It was released in the United States on June 3, 2022, by FilmRise.

Plot
In high school, Jack's girlfriend Elise went on a space mission. Twenty years later, Jack is a married politician and Elise returns to Earth, having not aged a day due to time dilation. Jack, who still has feelings for her, faces a moral dilemma about love.

Cast
 Todd Grinnell as Jack
 Brianna Hildebrand as Elise
 KaDee Strickland as Maggie
 Baron Vaughn as Patrice
 Ravi Patel as Roger

Production
In December 2021, FilmRise acquired the distribution rights. The film was released in the U.S. in select theaters and on demand on June 3, 2022.

Reception
On the review aggregator website Rotten Tomatoes, 33% of three reviews are positive.

References

External links
 

2022 films
2022 directorial debut films
Films about politicians
American romantic drama films
2020s English-language films
2020s American films